Montenegro competed at the 2013 World Championships in Athletics in Moscow, Russia, from 10–18 August 2013.
A team of 2 athletes was announced to represent the country in the event.

Results
(q – qualified, NM – no mark, SB – season best)

Men

Women

References

External links
IAAF World Championships – Montenegro

Nations at the 2013 World Championships in Athletics
World Championships in Athletics
Montenegro at the World Championships in Athletics